Gonzalo Raúl Barrios Castro (born April 17, 1995), known by his gamertag ZeRo, is a Chilean professional Super Smash Bros. player and streamer. He was considered the best Super Smash Bros. for Wii U player in the world throughout his career, with a record-breaking 56 consecutive tournament wins in the game from November 2014 to October 2015, including high-profile tournaments such as EVO 2015 and The Big House 5.  Prior to the release of Super Smash Bros. for Wii U, he was a top ranked Super Smash Bros. Brawl and Project M player. His best known characters are Diddy Kong in Super Smash Bros. for Wii U, Pit in Project M, Meta Knight in Brawl, and Fox in Melee. He is the only player to have earned more than US$100,000 playing Super Smash Bros. for Wii U competitively.

ZeRo retired from professional competition in January 2018 to focus on streaming and "close the chapter" with Super Smash Bros. for Wii U. Following allegations of sexting two minors in 2014, ZeRo's sponsors cut ties with him in July 2020 due to his admittance to the allegations. In September 2022, ZeRo settled his filed lawsuit and has reverted some of the allegations through a judge's mixed ruling.

Life and career

2005–2011: Early life and Super Smash Bros. tournaments 
ZeRo was born in Chillán in 1995. As a child, ZeRo was bullied and placed into a special needs program in school. Due to his family's financial issues and his own anxiety, he dropped out of school for three years. During this time, ZeRo received a Nintendo GameCube and would play speedruns on Super Mario Sunshine, as well as Super Smash Bros. Melee with his older sister.

In 2006, ZeRo began competing in Melee tournaments in his Chilean hometown at a local game store. In the following years, ZeRo regularly traveled between Chile, Argentina, and the United States to compete in regional and international Smash tournaments and events.

In 2011, ZeRo' sister died at age 27 due to complications from a brain aneurysm.

2011–2018: vVv Gaming and rise to professional Smash tournaments 
Between 2011 and 2012, after competing in various local and regional Melee tournaments, ZeRo was sponsored by Los Angeles-based vVv Gaming. In 2012, he began competing in professional esports events including Apex, By early 2014, it was estimated that ZeRo was earning approximately 40,000 a year from a combination of prize money, sponsorships, and Twitch streams.

ZeRo then qualified for the MLG Anaheim 2014 championship bracket and finished in 17th place. During this time, he was ranked by Melee it on Me as the 35th best Melee player in the world. In June 2014, he won the Super Smash Bros. for Wii U invitational at E3, moving up through the winner's bracket and defeating Hungrybox in the game's first-ever official tournament.

In November 2014, ZeRo criticized Diddy Kong's repetitive play style in Smash Bros. for Wii U, claiming that Diddy was "killing the game". However, ZeRo later retracted the statement and stated that Diddy Kong was his favorite character to play with, which eventually led to Diddy being his main character in tournaments.

At EVO 2015, ZeRo defeated Mr. R in the largest Smash for Wii U tournament to date. In the following month, Team SoloMid announced ZeRo as the second player in their Super Smash Bros. division.

At The Big House 5, ZeRo faced off in the grand finals against Team Liquid's Nairo. Despite a narrow escape from losses in the early tournament and a loss during the first set versus Nairo, ZeRo ended with a 3–2 win in the second set.

In MLG World Finals 2015, ZeRo defeated Nakat, StaticManny, Ally, and ESAM, moving on to challenge Nairo for the winner's bracket grand finals. There, Nairo took two sets off of ZeRo, ending ZeRo's reign at 56 consecutive victories.

ZeRo suffered from a growth on his middle finger in early 2016 that required surgical removal, and prevented him from playing Smash for several months.

2018–present: Partnerships, sexual misconduct allegations and cut ties
In January 2018, hours after ZeRo was once again ranked 1st on the Panda Global Rankings v4, ZeRo announced his hiatus from the Smash competitive scene, citing a need for variation in his life and goals. However, during this time he continued to be active in the Super Smash Bros. community and continued streaming on his Twitch channel.

In November 2018, ZeRo simultaneously announced his return to professional competition for Super Smash Bros. Ultimate and his signing to the Tempo Storm esports team. ZeRo announced a year later that he had signed an exclusive streaming rights deal with Facebook.

On July 3, 2020, ZeRo announced that he would be retiring from professional competition following allegations of sending sexual messages to minors when he was 19, and that he would also be ending all of his sponsorships. This includes an incident in 2014, where ZeRo allegedly asked "Katie", a 14-year-old girl at the time, to masturbate with ice and to take pictures. He later confessed that the incident was true and that he knew her age, but claimed the second alleged victim he spoke to earlier in 2014, "Laura", lied about her age. ZeRo later made a statement on YouTube, saying he is sorry and is seeking therapy. The following day, Tempo Storm announced that they would be severing ties with ZeRo, with Facebook following suit on July 5, and Twitch on July 23. When Inven Global asked the team's CEO, Andrey "Reynad" Yanyuk, if he saw "a world in which ZeRo is able to rehabilitate himself and potentially re-join Tempo Storm in some capacity", he responded:

"I don't know, I don't like to speculate about the future. I just take things one day at a time, you know? I think ZeRo is a very different person today than he was when he wrote some Skype messages at 19 years old. I think he's had a lot of personal growth over the past few years that I've personally seen, so I'm optimistic about his ability to recover."

After months of silence, on March 23, 2021, ZeRo's then ex-girlfriend Vanessa announced on Twitter that he had attempted suicide and was sent in for further care after being treated in a hospital. On April 26, 2021, ZeRo updated to the community that he successfully recovered from the hospital and has no intention to attempt suicide again. On November 16, 2021, ZeRo uploaded a video to YouTube, stating that he was returning to creating content and retracting his previous admission. On November 30, 2021, ZeRo sued his former roommate Jisu for defamation regarding four allegations she made against him in 2020. On September 9, 2022, ZeRo announced that a settlement had been reached in the lawsuit.

Awards and honors 
ZeRo was considered the third best Brawl player in the world by Clash Tournaments in the 2014 SSBBRank.

ZeRo was ranked as the best Smash for WiiU player in the world on all 4 editions of the Panda Global Rankings (PGR) prior to his retirement

In 2016, ZeRo was featured in the Guinness Book of World Records Gamer's Edition for his 56 consecutive Smash tournament victories.

Tournament placings

Super Smash Bros. Brawl

Super Smash Bros. Melee

Project M

Super Smash Bros. Wii U

Super Smash Bros. for Nintendo 3DS

Super Smash Bros. Ultimate

References

External links
 

Living people
1995 births
People from Chillán
People from Los Angeles
Sportspeople from Phoenix, Arizona
Super Smash Bros. for Wii U players
Chilean esports players
Chilean expatriates in the United States
Chilean YouTubers
Team SoloMid players
People from New Jersey
Project M players
Super Smash Bros. Brawl players
Gaming YouTubers
Tempo Storm players